Julien Mitchell (13 November 1888 – 4 November 1954) was an English actor, in films from the mid-1930s. Mitchell supported comedians George Formby and Will Hay, and appeared in some Hollywood films in the early war years, but is perhaps best remembered for his role as a mad train driver in the quota quickie The Last Journey, made at the start of his film career in 1936.

Mitchell was born in Glossop, Derbyshire. His parents were Julien Mitchell, a dentist, born in Haworth, West Riding of Yorkshire, and Ellen Kitchen, born in Bolton (in the Moor), Lancashire. His siblings born in Bolton were Martha Elizabeth, Josephine Mariner, Ada and Gertrude, while Mary Hannah and Hilda were born in Glossop.

Mitchell died in London nine days before his 66th birthday.

Partial filmography

 Rhodes of Africa (1936) - Minor Role (uncredited)
 The Last Journey (1936) - Bob Holt
 Educated Evans (1936) - Arthur Hackitt
 The Frog (1937) - John Maitland
 Double Exposures (1937) - Hector Rodman
 Mr. Smith Carries On (1937) - Mr. Minox
 Quiet Please (1938) - Holloway
 The Drum (1938) - Sergeant
 It's in the Air (1938) - Sergeant Major
 Lucky to Me (1939) - Butterworth (uncredited)
 Vigil in the Night (1940) - Matthew Bowley
 The Sea Hawk (1940) - Oliver Scott
 The Goose Steps Out (1942) - Gen. Von Goltz
 Rhythm Serenade (1943) - Mr. Jimson
 Schweik's New Adventures (1943) - Gestapo Chief
 Hotel Reserve (1944) - Michel Beghin, intelligence chief
 The Echo Murders (1945) - James Duncan
 Bedelia (1946) - Dr. McAfee
 Bonnie Prince Charlie (1948) - Gen. Cope (uncredited)
 A Boy, a Girl and a Bike (1949) - Mr. Howarth
 Chance of a Lifetime (1950) - Morris
 The Magnet (1950) - The Mayor
 The Galloping Major (1951) - Sergeant Adair
 High Treason (1951) - Mr. Philips - Union Rep (uncredited)
 Hobson's Choice (1954) - Sam Minns
 John Wesley (1954) - Tom Dekkar (final film role)

References

External links

1888 births
1954 deaths
English male stage actors
English male film actors
People from Glossop
Male actors from Derbyshire
20th-century English male actors